This list of tallest buildings in Kuwait ranks skyscrapers in Kuwait by height. The tallest building in Kuwait is currently the 80–story Al Hamra Tower, which rises  and was completed in 2011, it is also the world's fifteenth-tallest building.

Tallest completed buildings 
Only buildings over 150 metres (as determined by the Council on Tall Buildings and Urban Habitat) are included.

Tallest buildings under construction

Tallest approved buildings

Tallest proposed buildings

Tallest structures

See also 
 List of tallest structures in the Middle East
 List of tallest buildings in Asia
 List of tallest buildings and structures in the world
 Proposed tall buildings and structures

References

External links 
 Council on Tall Buildings and Urban Habitat Documents most planned, built and under-construction skyscrapers
 Emporis, International database of various buildings
 Urbika, Includes many projects not documented by other websites
 SkyscraperPage, Database and diagrams of most skyscrapers

Tallest
Kuwait
Kuwait